Trisul is a group of three Himalayan mountain peaks of western Kumaun, Uttarakhand, with the highest (Trisul I) reaching 7120m. The three peaks resemble a trident - in Sanskrit, Trishula, trident, is the weapon of Shiva.

Description of the massif and neighbouring peaks
The three peaks are named Trisul I, Trisul II, and Trisul III. The massif is a north-south ridge, with Trisul I at the north end and Trisul III at the south. The massif runs roughly North-South, and hence appears compressed when viewed from the south (Ranikhet, Kausani), and more stretched out from the Southeast (Chamoli, Bedini Bugyal).

Nanda Ghunti lies a few Kilometres to the northwest, while Mrigthuni is just to the southeast.

Climbing history

Trisul I

T. G. Longstaff made the first climbing reconnaissance of Trisul, in September 1905, focussing on the western and southern sides. He returned in 1907 with two other Britons, three Alpine guides, and a number of Gurkhas. They ascended through the Rishiganga valley, to the north of the peak, onto the Trisul Glacier, which lies on the east side. From there they climbed the northeast flank to the north ridge, reaching the summit on 12 June. At the time Trisul was probably the highest mountain to have been climbed. The climb was noted also for the first use of supplementary oxygen in a major climb. During the 1950s Harold Williams led Indian Army expeditions to the summit.

Routes on the west face and south ridge of Trisul I have also been climbed. The south side was first ascended in 1976 by a Yugoslavian expedition, with Slovenian climbers Andrej Graseli and Štefan Marenče reaching the peak on 15 May, followed by Vanja Matijevec the following day.

Trisul II and III
Trisul II and Trisul III were first climbed in 1960 by the Yugoslav team . They climbed from the Bidalgwar glacier, achieving the summit of Trisul II via the southern ridge and Trisul III via the north ridge.

Another Yugoslav expedition made the first traverse of the three peaks in 1987, and two members paraglided from the summit.

Access
The Trisul massif can be accessed via the following route: Almora - Kausani - Garur- Gwaldam - Debal - Bagargad - Wan - Bedini Bugyal - Kalu Vinayak - Roopkund - Trisul.

References

Other sources
 This My Voyage by T. G. Longstaff.
 Across Peaks and Passes of Kumaun Himalayas by Harish Kapadia.

Bageshwar
Mountains of Uttarakhand